826 Henrika (prov. designation:  or ) is a background asteroid from the central regions of the asteroid belt. It was discovered by German astronomer Max Wolf at the Heidelberg-Königstuhl State Observatory on 28 April 1916. Any reference to the origin of the asteroid's name is unknown.

Orbit and classification 

Henrika is a non-family asteroid of the main belt's background population when applying the hierarchical clustering method to its proper orbital elements. It orbits the Sun in the central asteroid belt at a distance of 2.2–3.3 AU once every 4 years and 6 months (1,631 days; semi-major axis of 2.71 AU). Its orbit has an eccentricity of 0.21 and an inclination of 7° with respect to the ecliptic. The body's observation arc begins at Heidelberg Observatory on 2 July 1921, more than five years after its official discovery observation.

Naming 

Any reference of this minor planet name to a person or occurrence is unknown.

Unknown meaning 

Among the many thousands of named minor planets, Henrika is one of 120 asteroids for which  has been published. All of these asteroids have low numbers, the first one being . They were discovered between 1876 and the 1930s, predominantly by astronomers Auguste Charlois, Johann Palisa, Max Wolf and Karl Reinmuth.

Physical characteristics 

In the Bus–Binzel SMASS classification, Henrika is a common, carbonaceous C-type asteroid, with an untypically high albedo (see below) for such spectral class. In a taxonomic classification based on MOVIS near-infrared colors, Henrika could not be assigned a final class and was labelled as undefined (U).

Rotation period 

In April 210, a rotational lightcurve of Henrika was obtained from six nights of photometric observations by Frederick Pilcher at the Organ Mesa Observatory  in New Mexico. Analysis of the classically shaped bimodal lightcurve gave a well-defined rotation period of  hours with a brightness variation of  magnitude. During the same apparition, a virtually identical period of  hours with an amplitude of  magnitude was determined by Kenda Albers and colleges of the Rose-Hulman Institute of Technology at the Oakley Southern Sky Observatory  in Australia.

Diameter and albedo 

The Collaborative Asteroid Lightcurve Link derives an albedo of 0.1103 and a diameter of 19.15 kilometers based on an absolute magnitude of 11.6. These timed observations are taken when the asteroid passes in front of a distant star.

Notes

References

External links 
 Lightcurve Database Query (LCDB), at www.minorplanet.info
 Dictionary of Minor Planet Names, Google books
 Discovery Circumstances: Numbered Minor Planets (1)-(5000) – Minor Planet Center
 
 

000826
Discoveries by Max Wolf
Named minor planets
000826
19160428